Juan Merheb (born 29 December 1970) is a Puerto Rican cyclist. He competed in the men's points race at the 1996 Summer Olympics.

References

External links
 

1970 births
Living people
Puerto Rican male cyclists
Olympic cyclists of Puerto Rico
Cyclists at the 1996 Summer Olympics
Place of birth missing (living people)
Pan American Games medalists in cycling
Pan American Games bronze medalists for Puerto Rico
Medalists at the 1995 Pan American Games
Cyclists at the 1995 Pan American Games